Lauren Howe (born April 30, 1959) is an American professional golfer who played on the LPGA Tour.

Career
Howe won once on the LPGA Tour in 1983.

Amateur wins
this list may be incomplete
1977 Women's Western Amateur

Professional wins

LPGA Tour wins (1)

LPGA Tour playoff record (0–1)

References

External links

American female golfers
Tulsa Golden Hurricane women's golfers
LPGA Tour golfers
Golfers from Utah
Sportspeople from Provo, Utah
1959 births
Living people